Dutch wine (Dutch: Nederlandse wijn) is wine made in the Netherlands. Although a small producer of wine, it is nowadays a strong growing branch of Dutch agriculture. Currently, the country has 180 commercial vineyards.

History
It is assumed that Romans who were used to bring their crops along with them could have successfully planted grapevine in Maastricht, called Traiectum ad Mosam.

The first mentioning of viniculture in what is now the Netherlands dates back to 968.

Modern production of wine was started in the 1970s.

Wine regions of the Netherlands

Most of the Dutch vineyards, collectively measuring 160 ha (2007), are to be found in the provinces of Gelderland and Limburg. In addition, there are vineyards in North Brabant, North Holland, Zeeland and more in northern Drenthe, Overijssel and Groningen.

Climate
Because of the unfavourable Dutch climate, the classic international grapes Merlot and Cabernet Sauvignon are not planted on a large scale.

Grapes
The following grape varieties are permitted by the applicable legislation (Verordening HPA Wijn 2009):

White
Auxerrois, Bacchus, Bianca, Chardonnay, Faber, Gewürztraminer, Hölder, Huxelrebe, Johanniter, Juwel, Kerner, Kernling, Merzling, Morio Muscat, Müller Thurgau, Orion, Ortega, Phoenix, Pinot blanc, Pinot gris/Ruländer, Rayon d'or, Reichensteiner, Riesling, Sauvignon blanc, Scheurebe, Schönburger, Seyval, Siegerrebe, Solaris, Sylvaner, Würzer

Red
Cabernet Franc, Domina, Dornfelder, Dunkelfelder, Florental, Frühburgunder, Gamay, Landal 244 N, Léon Millot, Maréchal Foch, Meunier, Pinot noir, Plantet, Portugiezer, Regent, Rondo, St. Laurent, Triomphe d'Alsace, Zweigeltrebe

References
Toegestane druivenrassen Nederland
Nederlandse wijnproeverij

 
Alcohol in the Netherlands